Lake Konomoc is a dammed lake near Palmertown in New London County, Connecticut.

References 

Geography of New London County, Connecticut